After the Rain, on Thursday is a 1985 Soviet musical children's fantasy film directed by Mikhail Yuzovskiy.

Plot
Once, after the rain on Thursday, the firstborn is delivered to King Avdey. The same day a boy is born to the housekeeper of Varvara, and a newborn is found in the cabbage. All three are called Ivan - and Avdey has ordered to raise the boys together. However, the housekeeper does her own way: she puts her Ivan into the imperial cradle, and gives the other two away for hard labor. Twenty years pass, and before Ivan the task arises to free himself, to defeat Koschei the Immortal and to release the beautiful princess Milolika...

Cast
Vladislav Toldykov - Ivan Tsarevich
Alexey Voytyuk - Ivan the Foundling
Gennady Frolov - Ivan, Varvara's son
Oleg Tabakov - Koschei the Immortal
Valentina Talyzina - Varvara
Marina Zudina - Milolika
Oleg Anofriyev - King Avdey
Marina Yakovleva Firebird
Tatyana Pelttser - grandmother-watchman on the swamp (Baba Yaga)
Yury Medvedev Yegory
Semyon Farada - Shah Babadur
Vladimir Fyodorov - hairy one
Vasily Kortukov - royal jester
Maria Barabanova - first nurse
Natalya Krachkovskaya - second nurse
Vladimir Bishoposian - servant of Babadur
Georgy Millyar - courtier Babadura
Sergey Nikolayev - shooter
Yuri Chernov - herald
Viktor Mamaev - villain with a scar
Yuliy Kim - swindler
Mikislav Yuzovsky - guardsman in penal servitude

References

External links
 

1980s children's fantasy films
1980s musical fantasy films
Films scored by Gennady Gladkov
Gorky Film Studio films
Soviet fantasy films
Soviet musical films
Films based on fairy tales